is a Buddhist temple of the Tendai sect in the Higashiyama district of Kyoto, Japan.

The temple was founded in 1164 by Taira no Kiyomori for the cloistered Emperor Go-Shirakawa.

Sanjūsangen-dō is most famous for its massively long hondō (main hall) dating from 1266 (Kamakura period) and designated a National Treasure of Japan, and the collection of sculptures it houses, including 1001 standing Thousand-armed Kannon, 28 standing attendants, a statue of Fūjin and a statue of Raijin, and the principal image of the temple, a big seated statue of Thousand-armed Kannon, all of them designated National Treasures in the category of sculptures, most of them dating to the Heian to Kamakura periods.

History 

Sanjūsangen-dō was founded by the famous samurai and politician Taira no Kiyomori (1118-1181) in 1164 for the cloistered Emperor Go-Shirakawa. He built the temple in the emperor's own compound Hōjūji-dono in order to gain a noble title, that of Chancellor of the Realm, becoming the first samurai to do so. Go-Shirakawa's compound was around 1100 square meters in size, divided into Minamidono (the southern estate) and Kitadono (the northern estate). When Go-Shirakawa died in 1192, he was buried in the temple's east Hokkedō (hall of the Lotus Sutra).

The temple complex originally included several buildings other than the hondō (main hall), including a gojūnotō (five-storied pagoda), a Kannondō (a hall of Kannon) and a Fudodō (a hall of the Four Heavenly Kings). All of these buildings were completely destroyed in 1249 by a fire that broke out in the city.  The Emperor Go-Saga (1220–1272) ordered the reconstruction of the hondō, which began in 1251. The building was completed in 1266 and survives to the present day. From the original 1000 standing Thousand-armed Kannon dating from the temple's construction in the late Heian period, only 124 were saved from the fire. The Emperor also ordered 876 new Kannon statues to replace the lost ones. These were created by three groups of Buddhist sculptors, Kei school (Keiha), En school (Enpa) and In school (Inpa), during the course of 16 years.

A popular kyūjutsu (archery) tournament known as Tōshiya ("passing arrow") was held at the west veranda of the temple for 255 years during the Edo period. The contest originated in the late 16th century dating back to 1606 when a samurai named Asaoka Heibei is said to have shot 51 arrows in rapid succession down the length of the veranda. In the beginning, archers shot arrows from the southern end of the veranda to the northern end where a curtain-like ornament was erected as a target. The contest gained popularity during the Edo period and by the late 17th century competitions between participants from the Owari and Kishū provinces were drawing big crowds.

The duel between the famous warrior Miyamoto Musashi and Yoshioka Denshichirō, leader of the Yoshioka-ryū, is popularly believed to have been fought just outside Sanjūsangen-dō in 1604.

In the second Sunday of January, the temple has an event known as the Rite of the Willow, where worshippers are touched on the head with a sacred willow branch to cure and prevent headaches, and a modern version of the Tōshiya, the Festival of the Great Target, is held on the west veranda, drawing roughly 2,000 participants from throughout Japan. Archers shoot arrows into targets approximately 50 - 100 centimeters in diameter and 60 meters (198 feet) away at the opposite end of the veranda.

Important features 
The main deity of the temple is Sahasrabhuja-arya-avalokiteśvara or the Thousand Armed Kannon.  The statue of the main deity was created by the Kamakura sculptor Tankei and is a National Treasure of Japan. The temple also contains one thousand life-size statues of the Thousand Armed Kannon which stand on both the right and left sides of the main statue in 10 rows and 50 columns.  Of these, 124 statues are from the original temple, rescued from the fire of 1249, while the remaining 876 statues were constructed in the 13th century. The statues are made of Japanese cypress clad in gold leaf. The temple is 120 - meter long. Around the 1000 Kannon statues stand 28 statues of guardian deities. There are also two famous statues of Fūjin and Raijin.

Guardian deities and Hinduism

The 28 guardian deities stand in front of the Buddhist Kannon have their origins in Sanskrit texts of Hinduism. These ideas came to Japan through China, and the presence of both Hindu and Buddhist deities at Sanjūsangen-dō temple in Kyoto suggest various theories of the origin and spread of the spiritual and cultural ideas from India to east Asia.

Life-size statues of these deities are housed at Sanjūsangen-dō where they guard the principal statue of the 11 feet tall seated Senju Kannon. The temple also features 1,000 standing statues of the Senju Kannon. The deities at Sanjūsangen-dō include Naraenkengo-ou, Misshaku-kongorikishi, Touhou-ten, Birurokusha-tennou, Birubakusha-tennou, Bishamonten, Daibon-tennou, Taishaku-ten, Daibenkudoku-ten, Mawara-ou, Jinmo-ten, Konpira-ou, Manzensha-ou, Hippakara-ou, Gobujyogo-ten, Konjikikujyaku-ou, Sanshitai-sho, Nandaryu-ou, Sakararyu-ou, Karura-ou, Kondai-ou, Mansen-ou, Magoraka-ou, Makeishura-ou, Kendabba-ou, Ashura-ou, Kinnara-ou and Basusennin. These deities trace their origins to Indian Dharmic mythology covering Hindu, Jain and Buddhist, and correspond to Varuna, Vishnu, Lakshmi, Brahma, Shiva, Garuda, Vayu, Narayana, Indra and others.

Gallery

See also 
List of National Treasures of Japan (sculptures)
List of National Treasures of Japan (temples)

Notes

External links 

 Sanjūsangen-dō official web site 
Accessibility information

1164 establishments in Asia
Buddhist temples in Kyoto
Religious organizations established in the 1160s
Tendai temples
National Treasures of Japan
Important Cultural Properties of Japan
1160s establishments in Japan
Buildings and structures completed in 1164